Luigi Almirante (30 September 1884 – 6 May 1963) was an Italian stage and film actor. He appeared in 62 films between 1921 and 1955.

Life and career 
The son of a stage actor, Almirante was born in Tunis, where the theatrical company of his father was touring at the time. He debuted on stage aged 14 years old.

During the World War I, he served at the Soldier's Theatre in Udine, under Renato Simoni. After the war, he was part of the Antonio Gandusio company for three years, and then joined the Theater Company Niccodemi, staying there until 1923. 

In 1925 Almirante formed with his cousin Italia Almirante Manzini a stage company which lengthy toured with some success in the United States. In 1928, he formed a company together with Giuditta Rissone and Sergio Tofano, and in 1931, he established a short-lived company with Andreina Pagnani and Nino Besozzi. Starting from 1932, he gradually focused in films, even if mainly cast in supporting and character roles. He was also active as a teacher at the Accademia d'Arte Drammatica, a voice actor and a dubber.

Selected filmography

 Beauty of the World (1927)
 Your Money or Your Life (1932)
 Ginevra degli Almieri (1935)
 Territorial Militia (1935)
 Those Two (1935)
 The Dance of Time (1936)
 I'll Give a Million (1936)
 Departure (1938)
 Star of the Sea (1938)
 Heartbeat (1939)
 The Dream of Butterfly (1939)
 Lucrezia Borgia (1940)
 Boccaccio (1940)
 Love Me, Alfredo! (1940)
 First Love (1941)
 The Secret Lover (1941)
 I Live as I Please (1942)
 Invisible Chains (1942)
 Harlem (1943)
 The Priest's Hat (1944)
 My Widow and I (1945)
 The Song of Life (1945)
 Crime News (1947)
 The Two Orphans (1947)
 Vanity (1947)
 Mad About Opera (1948)
 Messalina (1951)
 Rome-Paris-Rome (1951)

References

External links

1880s births
1963 deaths
Italian male film actors
Italian male silent film actors
20th-century Italian male actors
People from Tunis
Italian male stage actors